Young Women's Preparatory Academy (YWPA) is a grade 6-12 magnet school for girls, located in the Little Havana neighborhood of Miami, Florida, United States. It is a part of Miami-Dade County Public Schools (MDCPS).

YWPA was the first public school established in South Florida that was only for girls.

The school was established in 2006, with a focus on mathematics, science, and technology. It had about 400 students as of 2012, and as of 2014 had about the same number.

 Concepción I. Martinez is the principal.

Programs
Young Women's Preparatory Academy is a selective public secondary school in Miami, Fl, admitting less than 10% of applicants for the fall semester of 2011. Albeit the school's main track specializes highly in mathematics and sciences, the small class sizes allows for there to be more focus on the needs of each individual student, allowing counselors to structure a program that will help each student learn and gather experience in line with their goals past secondary school. 
A strength in Young Women's Preparatory Academy lies in the accessibility of the faculty members and the passion that all of the professors convey in their work. 
Professors are known for constructing a rigorous course curriculum, however, their accessibility and empathy for their students allows the opportunity for students to gather knowledge in an area at a depth beyond what their peers outside of the school would be receiving. 
Mathematics, sciences, and language arts in Young Women's Preparatory Academy are advanced, a year ahead of all other public school in MDCPS (Miami-Dade-Public-Schools). All subjects are taught with a multi-disciplinary approach, allowing for students to develop a context for the material they are learning.

Academic achievements
Circa 2012, U.S. News & World Report ranked YWPA #26 in the United States and #2 in Florida. As of that year, 300 girls were on the school's waiting list.

In 2013, YWPA won a Magnet Schools of Excellence Award from the Magnet Schools of America.

Teachers and administrators at YWPA have attributed the school's success to its lack of boys; its mentorship program which has older students assist younger ones; its academic focus towards mathematics, science and technology; its small student body; and the teachers' concern for their students.

References

External links
Young Women's Preparatory Academy website
Miami-Dade County public schools

Miami-Dade County Public Schools
High schools in Miami
Public high schools in Florida
Schools in Miami
Girls' schools in Florida